Hebeulima is a genus of sea snails, marine gastropod mollusks in the family Eulimidae.

Species
There are two known species within this genus of gastropods, these include the following:
 Hebeulima columnaria (May, 1915)
 Hebeulima crassiceps (Laseron, 1955)
 Hebeulima insignis (Turton, 1932)
 Hebeulima inusta (Hedley, 1906)

Species brought into synonymy
 Hebeulima tumerae (Laseron, 1955): synonym of Oceanida tumerae (Laseron, 1955)

References

 Warén, A. (1984). A generic revision of the family Eulimidae (Gastropoda, Prosobranchia). Journal of Molluscan Studies. suppl 13: 1-96

External links
 To World Register of Marine Species

Eulimidae